Joanna Bacalso  is a Filipino-Canadian television and movie actress and former model.

Early life
Bacalso was born in Cebu, Philippines, and moved to Toronto, Ontario with her two younger brothers when she was eight years old.

Career
Represented by Ford Models, her modeling work included both print and runway for clients, including Tommy Hilfiger and Banana Republic. Bacalso transitioned from a modeling career into film and television. Her television credits include guest starring appearances on the series The Jamie Foxx Show, La Femme Nikita, Veronica's Closet, and Wish You Were Here, alongside Dave Chappelle.

Bacalso played a recurring role on the series by CBS, The District, and a multiple episode supporting role on the series Ally McBeal. Bacalso made her feature film debut in the comedy by Orion Pictures, Car 54, Where Are You? featuring Rosie O'Donnell and Fran Drescher. Bacalso appeared in the feature films Bedazzled and Dude, Where's My Car?.  She is most well known for her role as Barb in Disney's Snow Dogs featuring Cuba Gooding, Jr. and James Coburn. She also starred in the movie Half Baked.

Filmography

Film

Television

References

External links

Living people
Actresses from Cebu
Filipino emigrants to Canada
20th-century Canadian actresses
Year of birth missing (living people)